Dover Air Force Base or Dover AFB  is a United States Air Force (USAF) base under the operational control of Air Mobility Command (AMC), located  southeast of the city of Dover, Delaware. The 436th Airlift Wing is the host wing and runs the busiest and largest air freight terminal in the Department of Defense.

History
Construction of Municipal Airport, Dover Airdrome began in March 1941 and the facility was opened on December 17, 1941.  It was converted to a U.S. Army Air Corps airfield just weeks after the December 7, 1941, attack on Pearl Harbor. It was renamed Dover Army Airbase on April 8, 1943;  *Dover Subbase on June 6, 1943, and Dover Army Airfield on February 2, 1944. With the establishment of the United States Air Force (USAF) on September 18, 1947, the facility was renamed Dover Air Force Base on January 13, 1948.

World War II
The origins of Dover Air Force Base begin in March 1941 during World War II when the United States Army Air Corps (USAAC) indicated a need for the airfield as a training airfield and assumed jurisdiction over the municipal airport at Dover, Delaware.

Once the airport came under military control an immediate construction program began to turn the civil airport into a military airfield. Construction involved runways and airplane hangars, with three concrete runways, several taxiways and a large parking apron and a control tower. Several large hangars were also constructed. Buildings were ultimately utilitarian and quickly assembled. Most base buildings, not meant for long-term use, were constructed of temporary or semi-permanent materials. Although some hangars had steel frames and the occasional brick or tile brick building could be seen, most support buildings sat on concrete foundations but were of frame construction clad in little more than plywood and tarpaper.  Initially under USAAC, the name of the facility was Municipal Airport, Dover Airdrome and the airfield opened on 17 December 1941.   The airfield was assigned to the First Air Force.

On 20 December the first military unit arrived at Dover's new airfield: the 112th Observation Squadron of the Ohio National Guard which flew anti-submarine patrols off the Delaware Coast.  In early 1942 three B-25 Mitchell bomber squadrons arrived with the 45th Bombardment Group from I Bomber Command, later part of Army Air Forces Antisubmarine Command, assumed the anti-submarine mission.

On 8 April 1943, the name of the airfield was changed to Dover Army Air Base.    The antisubmarine mission ended on 6 June and construction crews moved back to the base for a major upgrading project that lengthened the main runway to 7,000 feet.   During the construction period and continuing into June 1944, Dover AAB became a sub-base of Camp Springs Army Airfield, Maryland.

Full operational capability was restored to Dover in September, and seven P-47 Thunderbolt squadrons arrived for training in preparation for eventual involvement in the European Theater.  The 83d Fighter Group was assigned to Dover as the Operational Training Unit.  The 83d was redesignated the 125th Base Unit on 10 April 1944 with little change in its mission.   It was further redesignated as the 125th Army Air Force base Unit on 15 September 1944.

In 1944 the Air Technical Service Command chose Dover as a site to engineer, develop, and conduct classified air-launched rocket tests. The information collected during these experiments resulted in the effective deployment of air-to-surface rockets in both the European and Pacific combat theaters.

On 1 September 1946 as a result of the drawdown of United States forces after the war, Dover Army Airfield, was placed on temporary inactive status. A small housekeeping unit, the 4404th Base Standby Squadron, remained on the airfield for care and maintenance of the facility.

Cold War and Vietnam

Dover Airfield was reactivated on 1 August 1950 as a result of the Korean War and the expansion of the USAF in response to the Soviet threat in the Cold War.  On February 1, 1951, the 148th Fighter Interceptor Squadron of the Pennsylvania Air National Guard arrived with P-51 Mustang fighter aircraft. During the 1950s problems developed with many of the facilities in Dover, which had been hastily constructed to support its World War II mission. As a result, a massive Civil Engineering project was undertaken to modernize the base.

On April 1, 1952, Dover was transferred to the Military Air Transport Service (MATS) and became home to 1607th Air Transport Wing (Heavy). A full function hospital was completed in 1958 and base housing was expanded to handle 1,200 families in 1961. On January 1, 1966, the Military Air Transport Service was redesignated the Military Airlift Command (MAC). Along with the reorganization, the 1607th was discontinued and the 436th Military Airlift Wing (436 MAW) activated and assumed the mission at Dover. The 436 MAW started replacing C-141 Starlifters and C-133 Cargomasters with the new C-5 Galaxy in 1971. Two years later Dover became the first all C-5 equipped wing in the USAF, trading the last of its C-141 to Charleston AFB, South Carolina.

During the Vietnam War, more than 20,000 dead American soldiers were brought back to the United States via Dover.  The Vietnam War dead comprise over 90% of all the remains processed at Dover before 1988.

When the Yom Kippur War broke out between Israel and the combined forces of Egypt and Syria on October 13, 1973 the 436 MAW responded with a 32-day airlift that delivered 22,305 tons of munitions and military equipment to Israel. The 436 MAW also assisted in the evacuation of Americans from Iran on December 9, 1978, following the Islamic Revolution.  That year, Dover AFB was also used to store hundreds of bodies from the mass murder and suicide of the Jonestown community in Guyana.

Some of the more memorable flights during the post-war period included the airdrop and test firing of a Minuteman I intercontinental ballistic missile and the delivery of a 40-ton superconducting magnet to Moscow during the Cold War, for which the crew received the Mackay Trophy.

After the Space Shuttle Challenger disaster, the remains of the seven astronauts were transferred to Dover AFB. It is one of only seven airports in the country that served as launch abort facilities for the Space Shuttle.

In March 1989, C-5s from Dover delivered special equipment used to clean up the Exxon Valdez oil spill in Prince William Sound, Alaska. On June 7, 1989, while attending the Airlift Rodeo, a 436 MAW C-5 set a world record when it airdropped 190,346 pounds and 73 paratroopers. In October 1983, the wing flew 24 missions in support of Operation Urgent Fury, the Grenada rescue operation and later flew 16 missions to support Operation Just Cause, the invasion of Panama, in December 1989 – January 1990.

During Desert Shield, the wing flew approximately 17,000 flying hours and airlifted a total of 131,275 tons of cargo in support of combat operations after the Iraqi invasion of Kuwait.

Southern Air Transport cargo airline leased a hangar at the south east end of the base in the 1980s, during Iran Contra.

Modern era

In 1992, with the disestablishment of Military Airlift Command, Dover AFB was transferred to the newly established Air Mobility Command (AMC) and the 436 MAW and 512 MAW (Associate) were redesignated as the 436th Airlift Wing (436 AW) and the 512th Airlift Wing (512 AW), respectively.  Dover also served as a major port of entry and exit for the conflicts in the Balkans and Somalia during the latter half of the 1990s.

Following the attacks of September 11, 2001, the 436 AW and 512 AW became major participants in Operation Enduring Freedom and Operation Iraqi Freedom.  An aircrew from Dover's 3rd Airlift Squadron landed the first C-5 in Iraq in late 2003 when they landed at Baghdad International Airport and the two wings continue to support operations in the region.

Also following September 11, 2001, U.S. Army mortuary specialists organized support for Pentagon recovery efforts out of the base.  This effort evolved into the Joint Personal Effects Depot, which supports recovery and redistribution of the personal effects of wounded and killed personnel from all arms of the military.  In 2003, the Depot was transferred to Aberdeen Proving Ground in Maryland. Dover AFB is also where  service members, from all six branches of service, killed in combat are repatriated. Their remains are processed, inspected for unexploded ordnance, cleaned, and prepared for burial before being escorted to the point of interment decided by the family. The Depot returned to Dover in 2011, when in April a new US$14 million custom-built facility officially opened.

On April 3, 2006, a C-5 Galaxy crashed short of a runway, skidding into a farm field. There were no fatalities.

By 2008, the air traffic tower serving the airfield, built in 1955, was the oldest such tower in use in the USAF. In 2009 the base received a new 128-foot tall tower, overlapping the original 103-foot one which was donated to the Air Mobility Command Museum, accessible to visitors.

Dover AFB is the first air force base to receive the new C-5M "Super Galaxy", receiving the aircraft on February 9, 2009 (named "The Spirit of Global Reach").

On February 2, 2015 the 9,600 foot runway 01-19 was closed for repairs. The runway was re-opened for operation on September 23, 2016. During the repair,  the 12,900 foot runway 14–32 was temporarily cut in half so that the intersection of the two runways could be repaired. C-17 Globemasters could land on either half of runway 14–32.

Airlines and destinations

Cargo

Role and operations 

Dover AFB is home to the 436th Airlift Wing (436 AW) of the Air Mobility Command (AMC), known as the "Eagle Wing", and the AMC-gained 512th Airlift Wing (512 AW) of the Air Force Reserve Command (AFRC), referred to as the "Liberty Wing".  It was previously the only base to solely operate the massive C-5 Galaxy and now operates both that aircraft plus the C-17 Globemaster III.  The 436 AW has two active flying squadrons (the 3rd Airlift Squadron, which now operates the C-17, and 9th Airlift Squadron), and the 512 AW has two AFRC flying squadrons (the 326th Airlift Squadron and the 709th Airlift Squadron).

Dover AFB is also the home for the largest military mortuary in the Department of Defense, and has been used for processing military personnel killed in both war and peacetime; the remains of those killed overseas are traditionally brought to Dover AFB before being transferred to family. The Charles C. Carson Center for Mortuary Affairs has also been used to identify remains of civilians in certain exceptional circumstances: in 1978 for the victims of the Jonestown mass murder/suicide, in 1986 for identifying the remains of the crew of the Space Shuttle Challenger, and in 2003 for the crew of the Space Shuttle Columbia. It was also a major site for identifying the remains of military personnel killed in the 9/11 attacks.   During the night of October 28, 2009, before making a decision on the committal of further troops to Afghanistan, President Barack Obama visited the base to receive the bodies of several American soldiers killed in Afghanistan.

Two sections of the 436th Aerial Port Squadron warehouse collapsed on February 18, 2003, as a result of a record snow storm. No one was injured in the collapse that caused more than an estimated $1 million in damages. The damage covered two of the six cargo processing bays in the facility.

Dover AFB is also home to the Air Mobility Command Museum.

Air Show
Dover Air Force Base holds an annual air show, with the most recent occurring in May 2022. The show includes static displays of military aircraft and equipment, and flight demonstrations of the United States Air Force Thunderbirds or United States Navy Blue Angels demonstration teams.

Based units 
Flying and notable non-flying units based at Dover Air Force Base:

United States Air Force 

Air Mobility Command (AMC)
 Eighteenth Air Force
 436th Comptroller Squadron
 436th Airlift Wing (Host wing)
 436th Operations Group
 3rd Airlift Squadron – C-17A Globemaster III
 9th Airlift Squadron – C-5M Super Galaxy
 436th Operations Support Squadron
 436th Maintenance Group
 436th Aerial Port Squadron
 436th Aircraft Maintenance Squadron
 736th Aircraft Maintenance Squadron
 436th Maintenance Operations Squadron
 436th Maintenance Squadron

 436th Mission Support Group
 
 436th Civil Engineer Squadron
 436th Communications Squadron
 436th Contracting Squadron
 436th Force Support Squadron
 436th Logistics Readiness Squadron
 436th Security Forces Squadron
 436th Medical Group
 436th Aerospace Medicine Squadron
 436th Medical Operations Squadron
 436th Medical Support Squadron
Air Force Reserve Command (AFRC)
 Fourth Air Force
 512th Airlift Wing
 512th Operations Group
 326th Airlift Squadron – C-17A Globemaster III
 512th Airlift Control Flight
 512th Operations Support Squadron
 709th Airlift Squadron – C-5M Super Galaxy
 512th Maintenance Group
 512th Aircraft Maintenance Squadron
 512th Maintenance Squadron
 712th Aircraft Maintenance Squadron
 512th Mission Support Group
 46th Aerial Port Squadron
 71st Aerial Port Squadron
 512th Civil Engineer Squadron
 512th Force Support Squadron
 512th Logistics Readiness Squadron
 512th Memorial Affairs Squadron
 512th Security Forces Squadron
 512th Aerospace Medicine Squadron

United States Army 
US Army Human Resources Command
 The Adjutant General Directorate
 Casualty & Mortuary Affairs Operations Center
 Joint Personal Effects Depot

Department of Defense 
Defense Health Agency
 Research and Innovation Directorate
 Armed Forces Medical Examiner System

Department of the Air Force 
Field Operating Agencies
Air Force Mortuary Affairs Operations (AFMAO)
 Charles C. Carson Center for Mortuary Affairs (Port Mortuary)

Major assigned commands

First Air Force, December 17, 1941
 Air Service Command, December 19, 1942
First Air Force, March 17, 1943
Continental Air Forces, June 6, 1945
 Redesignated: Strategic Air Command, March 21, 1946
 Tactical Air Command, April 1, 1946
Continental Air Command, December 1, 1948
Air Defense Command, January 1, 1951
Military Air Transport Service, April 1, 1952
 Redesignated: Military Airlift Command, January 1, 1966
Air Mobility Command, June 1, 1992 – present

Major units assigned

 45th Bombardment Group, May 16 –  August 30, 1942
 312th Air Base and HQ Sq, August 31, 1942 – April 10, 1944
 365th Fighter Group, August 12 –  November 19, 1943
 83d Fighter Group, November 22, 1943 – April 10, 1944
 Redesignated: 125th Base Unit, April 10, 1944 – September 15, 1944
 Redesignated: 125th AAF Base Unit, September 15, 1944 – March 31, 1946
 320th AAF Base Unit, April 1, 1946 – August 23, 1948
 Redesignated  4404th Standby Base Sq, August 23, 1948 – November 27, 1949
 336th Fighter-Interceptor Squadron, August 13 –  November 10, 1950
 46th Fighter-Interceptor Squadron, November 1, 1952 – July 1, 1958

 80th Air Base Sq, February 1, 1952 – August 1, 1953
 1607th Air Base Group, 1 August 1953
 Redesignated 1607th Air Transport Wing, 9 November 1953 – January 8, 1966
 Aerial Port of Embarkation, May 1, 1954 – February 15, 1978
 98th Fighter-Interceptor Squadron, March 8, 1956 – June 20, 1963
 4728th Air Defense Group, February 8, 1957 – July 1, 1958
 95th Fighter-Interceptor Squadron, July 1, 1963 – January 31, 1973
 436th Military Airlift (later Airlift) Wing, November 8, 1966 – present
 912th Military Airlift Group, September 25, 1968 – July 1, 1973
 512th Military Airlift (later Airlift) Wing, July 1, 1973 – present

Geography
The base is treated as a census-designated place named "Dover Base Housing." It is part of the Dover, Delaware Metropolitan Statistical Area. Dover Base Housing had a population of 3,450 at the 2010 census. According to the United States Census Bureau, Dover Base Housing has a total area of 0.7 square miles (1.7 km2), all  land.

Dover Base Housing consists of a development called Eagle Heights Family Housing, which is made up of 980 homes in single-family, duplex, triplex, and fourplex configurations. The development features a community center, multiple neighborhood centers, picnic areas, fitness center, and golf course. Students in the development attend public schools in the Caesar Rodney School District.

Since 1997, the base has been served by three highway exits with Delaware Route 1, allowing quick access to Dover and to southern Delaware from the complex. Dover AFB provides almost $470 million a year in revenue to the city of Dover, making it the third largest industry in Delaware.

Demographics

As of the census of 2000, there were 3,394 people, 1,032 households, and 1,017 families residing in the base.  The population density was 5,061.6 people per square mile (1,955.9/km2).  There were 1,245 housing units at an average density of 1,856.7 per square mile (717.5/km2).  The racial makeup of the base was 72.57% White, 16.59% African American, 0.77% Native American, 1.86% Asian, 0.12% Pacific Islander, 2.80% from other races, and 5.30% from two or more races. Hispanic or Latino of any race were 7.75% of the population.

There were 6,032 households, out of which 76.1% had children under the age of 18 living with them, 90.2% were married couples living together, 5.4% had a female householder with no husband present, and 1.4% were non-families. 1.2% of all households were made up of individuals, and 0.2% had someone living alone who was 65 years of age or older.  The average household size was 3.29 and the average family size was 3.30.

In the base the population was spread out, with 40.2% under the age of 18, 16.5% from 18 to 24, 41.5% from 25 to 44, 1.7% from 45 to 64, and 0.1% who were 65 years of age or older.  The median age was 23 years. For every 100 females, there were 103.0 males.  For every 100 females age 18 and over, there were 97.5 males.

The median income for a household in the base was $34,318, and the median income for a family was $34,659. Males had a median income of $26,322 versus $20,444 for females. The per capita income for the base was $12,119.  About 5.2% of families and 4.2% of the population were below the poverty line, including 3.5% of those under age 18 and none of those age 65 or over.

Air Mobility Command Museum

Hangar 1301 at Dover Air Force Base is home to the Air Mobility Command Museum. The museum is dedicated to military airlift and air refueling aircraft and the people who maintain them. It has a large collection of fully restored cargo and tanker aircraft. Tours are conducted during the day by volunteers, many of whom are retired pilots, navigators, flight engineers and loadmasters who provide first-person narratives of actual events. An attached  building houses a theater, museum store, exhibit workshop, and various offices. A  aircraft parking area allows close-up inspection of the outside aircraft. The museum also maintains archives related to the history of the Air Mobility Command and Dover AFB. Building 1301, Dover Air Force Base was added to the National Register of Historic Places in 1994.

There are 33 airframes in the collection in 2015, and a staff of more than 170 volunteers. A single battered Douglas C-47A Skytrain, salvaged in 1986 off of a dump at Olmsted Air Force Base, near Harrisburg, Pennsylvania, after being used for target practice, was the museum's modest beginning. Airlifted to Dover AFB by a Pennsylvania National Guard helicopter, "It was the first aircraft restored for the newly conceptualized museum that would form here."

Founded as the Dover AFB Historical Center on 13 October 1986, it originally was housed in three hangars within the main area of the base. It was officially recognized with museum status in 1995 and moved to its current location in 1996. On 5 February 1997, Air Mobility Command officially named the Dover AFB Museum as the AMC Museum.

Education
The Dover Base Housing is located in the Caesar Rodney School District. It is assigned to the Dover Air Base schools for grades K-8: Major George S. Welch Elementary School and Dover Air Force Base Middle School. Caesar Rodney High School in Camden is the comprehensive high school for the entire district.

Wilmington University has a center on Dover AFB.

See also

 Delaware World War II Army Airfields
 Dover test
 List of United States Air Force installations

References

External links

 
Air Mobility Command Museum 
 Civil Air Terminal at Dover AFB (Delaware River and Bay Authority)
 

1941 establishments in Delaware
Bases of the United States Air Force
Airports in Delaware
Census-designated places in Kent County, Delaware
Military installations in Delaware
Military Superfund sites
Airfields of the United States Army Air Forces in Delaware
Military facilities on the National Register of Historic Places in Delaware
Superfund sites in Delaware
Historic American Buildings Survey in Delaware
Census-designated places in Delaware
National Register of Historic Places in Dover, Delaware
Space Shuttle Emergency Landing Sites